Medea Dome is a snow dome,  high, marking the eastern end of Philippi Rise on the east coast of Graham Land, Antarctica. It was surveyed by the Falkland Islands Dependencies Survey in 1953, and was named in 1956 by the UK Antarctic Place-Names Committee in association with Jason Peninsula; in Greek mythology Medea helped Jason to obtain the Golden Fleece and later became his wife.

References

Mountains of Graham Land
Oscar II Coast